A private view is a special viewing of an exhibition by invitation only, often an art exhibition and normally a preview at the start of a public exhibition. Typically wine and light refreshments are served in the form of a reception. If the works on show are by a living artist, it is normal for them to attend the private view. Artworks on view are typically for sale.

This type of exhibition set in a private setting is commonly referred to as the vernissage.

References

Visual arts exhibitions
Private view
Social events